Xavier Soria (born 2 June 1972) is an Andorran football player. He has played for Andorra national team.

National team statistics

References

1972 births
Living people
Andorran footballers

Association football midfielders
Andorra international footballers